Blakea acostae is a species of plant in the family Melastomataceae. It is endemic to Ecuador.  Its natural habitat is subtropical or tropical moist montane forests.

References

acostae
Endemic flora of Ecuador
Endangered plants
Taxonomy articles created by Polbot